Da Huang Pictures is a Malaysian film production company. It was established in 2004 and its members are Tan Chui Mui, James Lee, Liew Seng Tat and Amir Muhammad. Its films have been screened in many prestigious international film festivals and have won numerous awards.

Filmography 

Feature films:

 Love Conquers All (film) (2006)
 Before We Fall in Love Again (2006)
 Flower in the Pocket (2007)
 Things We Do When We Fall in Love (2007)
 Waiting for Love (2007)
 Punggok Rindukan Bulan (2008)
 Call If You Need Me (2009)
Year Without A Summer (2010)

Documentaries:

 Apa Khabar Orang Kampung (Village People Radio Show) (2007)
 Malaysian Gods (2009)

Online Shop 

In 2007, Da Huang Pictures started an online shop to sell DVDs of not only their films but selected other independent Malaysian and South-East Asian films. To date, the best-selling title has been Flower in the Pocket.

External links 
 Da Huang Pictures
 Da Huang Pictures at the Internet Movie Database
  Da Huang Pictures Onlineshop
  Tan Chui Mui interview after 10 years

Notes 

 
2004 establishments in Malaysia
Mass media companies established in 2004
Film production companies of Malaysia
Privately held companies of Malaysia